William or Bill Buchanan may refer to:
 William Buchanan (Manitoba politician) (1865–?), Irish-born Canadian Conservative politician
 William Buchanan (locomotive designer) (1830–1910), designed trains for the New York Central
 William Buchanan (pastoralist) (1824–1911), Australian pastoralist and gold prospector
 William Buchanan (footballer) (1911–?), Scottish amateur footballer
 William Buchanan (art dealer) (1777–1864), British art dealer

 William Izett Buchanan (born 1972), American expatriate basketball player
 William I. Buchanan (1853–1909), American diplomat
 William Ashbury Buchanan (1876–1954), journalist, publisher and politician based in Alberta
 William Murdoch Buchanan (1897–1966), Canadian politician and dentist
 Bill Buchanan (24), a fictional character in 24
 Bill Buchanan (computer scientist) (born 1961), Scottish computer scientist
 Bill Buchanan (songwriter) (1930–1996), American songwriter
 Billy Buchanan (1924–1999), Scottish footballer with Carlisle United and Barrow